Sidney Dawson (born 1893) was an English professional footballer who played as a full-back.

References

1893 births
People from Mexborough
Footballers from Doncaster
English footballers
Association football fullbacks
Denaby United F.C. players
Sheffield Wednesday F.C. players
Kilnhurst Colliery F.C. players
Northampton Town F.C. players
Grimsby Town F.C. players
English Football League players
Year of death missing